Korzkiew  is a village in the administrative district of Gmina Zielonki, within Kraków County, Lesser Poland Voivodeship, in southern Poland.

The village has a population of 170. The nearby Korzkiew Castle was part of the Szlak Orlich Gniazd "trail of eagles nests", one of a chain of 14th century (reign of King Casimir) medieval castles that protected the north- western border of royal Krakow that went all the way to  Czestochowa.  The castle, Zamek Korzkiew, was restored and currently houses a boutique hotel and a conference center-banquet hall.

References

Villages in Kraków County